Gioia Barbieri (born 9 July 1991) is a retired Italian tennis player.

Tennis career
Barbieri was born in Forlimpopoli. She trained at the San Marino Tennis Academy, and was coached by Claudio Pistolesi. Her father is Andrea, her mother is Marcella and she has one sister called Maria Sole.

Barbieri won eight singles and 15 doubles titles on the ITF Women's Circuit in her career. On 15 September 2014, she reached her highest WTA singles ranking of 170, whilst her best doubles ranking was 165, which she achieved on 13 April 2015, having reached the final of the 2015 Katowice Open.

İn June 2016, Barbieri announced via her Facebook account her retirement from professional tennis, to start working on the family estate.

WTA career finals

Doubles: 1 (runner-up)

ITF finals

Singles: 10 (8–2)

Doubles: 19 (15–4)

References

External links
 
 

1991 births
Living people
Italian female tennis players
21st-century Italian women